"Lonely" is a song by Australian recording artist Casey Donovan. The song was released on 19 May 2017.

Donovan told Luke Dennehy of The Herald Sun the song comes from a deep, personal place. "It's basically my heart breaking on a song, the inspiration is love. Everyone is either happy in love, lost in love, or sad in love. One day when I do fall in love, I will have my ultimate love song." She added: "It's an expression of my life, and what I was feeling at the time of writing it."

Donovan performed "Lonely" on The Morning Show on 18 May 2017 and on 3AW on 19 May 2017 with Denis Walter.

Background and release
In 2016, Donovan played Killer Queen in the Australian production of We Will Rock You. Between January and March 2017, Donovan was a contestant on the third season of I'm a Celebrity...Get Me Out of Here!, which she later won. On 23 April 2017, Donovan performed an acoustic version of David Bowie's "Heroes" at the 2017 Logie Awards, which received a standing ovation.

Donovan told auspOp: "It has been 10 years since I released my first independent EP Eye 2 Eye and I am so excited to be able to share this with the Australian public. I can't wait for people to hear what I've been working on in the studio. It has been a long while coming. After finishing up with We Will Rock You late last year it dawned upon me that I really wanted to get back into writing my own music and I really wanted to make that my main focus."

Reception
Sounds of Oz said: "This is music in its purest form, with its heart its sleeve and vocals and lyrics that don't hide behind too much studio wizardry. It tells the story of a girl who desperately wants to be loved, yet fears she’ll always be lonely." They also added: "Casey, it's wonderful to have you back."

Track listing

 "Lonely" – 4:06

Charts

References

2017 songs
2017 singles
Casey Donovan (singer) songs